"Why Goodbye" is a song written by Richard Leigh and Mark Wright and recorded by American country music artist Steve Wariner.  It was released in April 1984 as the third single from the album Midnight Fire.  The song reached #12 on the Billboard Hot Country Singles & Tracks chart.

Critical reception
A review in Cash Box was positive toward the song, stating that "The song utilizes harmonies to top off Wariner’s richer vocals. A ripping sax joins some bass rifts to give the tune an even better chance to* crossover onto the A/C charts."

Chart performance

References

1984 singles
Steve Wariner songs
Songs written by Richard Leigh (songwriter)
Songs written by Mark Wright (record producer)
RCA Records singles
Song recordings produced by Tony Brown (record producer)
Song recordings produced by Norro Wilson
1984 songs